Cetratus is a genus of South Pacific crab spiders that was first described by Władysław Kulczyński in 1911.

Species
 it contains five species, found in Australia and Papua New Guinea:
Cetratus annulatus Kulczyński, 1911 (type) – New Guinea
Cetratus caecutiens (L. Koch, 1876) – Australia (Queensland)
Cetratus circumlitus (L. Koch, 1876) – Australia (New South Wales)
Cetratus rubropunctatus (Rainbow, 1920) – Australia (Queensland, Lord Howe Is.)
Cetratus tenuis (L. Koch, 1875) – Australia (Queensland, New South Wales)

See also
 List of Thomisidae species

References

Further reading

Araneomorphae genera
Spiders of Asia
Spiders of Australia
Thomisidae